Abbi is a town in Uzo-Uwani Local Government Area of Enugu State, Nigeria. It is an ancient traditional town historically comprising three main communities – Ezikolo, Ejona, and Uwani, with a total of upwards of 60 villages. The villages are spread across the communities in the valleys, upland areas and at farm settlements called "Ogbo".

Ezikolo Abbi has since been recognized by Enugu state government as an autonomous community of its own and includes the villages of Anagoro, Ibeku, Isiama, Umavuruma, Ama-ebo, Apapam, Amanyi; and Ama-eze, Umuagada and Ifuagbo, three of which territory is also called Owerre community. The other settlements of Ezikolo are found at Igbudi, Nwaedor, Oda-Ogbo, Ugwu-Ogazi, Achokonya, Amirowa, Ujobo and Abiamdu where Ezikolo shares borders with Anuka, Okpuje and Edem-Egu.

Ejona Abbi is the largest of the three communities and contains Enugu-Abbi, Umunye, Umunocha, Bebe, Nnuzu, Ala-echara, Ugwuogbada, Ikwoka, Uwenu-okpe, Ama-ngwu, Eziugwuobi, Owereeze, Ama-ugwu and other farm settlements. These are subdivided into Ejona Oda – villages in the valley plain, Ejona Ugwu for those on hill top and Ejona Ogbo for the many villages across farm settlements.
Uwani Abbi has three wards – Alaozara:- Isiyi, Enwerike, U'ba villages. Edem-Eke & Ekaibite:- Ama-eke, Ama-oba, Umuoka, Umushere and other farm settlements like Orukwu etc.

Invasion 
There was an attack on Ejuona-Ogbo Village, a part of the Abbi community, in early February 2016. Two residents (Mr Fidelis Okeja and her immediate sister, Mrs Mercy Okeja) were killed and 19 persons were declared missing, with seven houses and motorcycles being razed by Fulani herdsmen.

References

Towns in Enugu State